Auguste Marie François Beernaert (26 July 1829 – 6 October 1912) was the prime minister of Belgium from October 1884 to March 1894, and the 1909 Nobel Peace Prize laureate.

Life
Born in Ostend in the United Kingdom of the Netherlands 1829, he entered the Faculty of Law at the Catholic University of Leuven at age 17. He finished five years later with greatest distinction.

He was elected to the Chamber of Deputies in 1873, and became Minister of Public Works under Jules Malou, greatly improving the rail, canal and road systems. After his tenure as Prime Minister, he represented Belgium at the Hague conventions of 1899 and 1907. He was also co-winner (with Paul d'Estournelles de Constant) of the Nobel Peace Prize in 1909 for his work at the Permanent Court of Arbitration. He was chosen as president of the panel established under the rules of that organization in the Sarvarkar Case in 1911. A year later, he died in Lucerne, Switzerland. A lawyer by profession, he served as Minister of Public Works. He served as prime minister and Minister of Finance from 1884 to 1894. He held the post of president of the international law of association from 1903 to 1905. He was Belgium's first representative to the Hague peace conferences in 1899 and 1907. In the year 1912 he was hospitalised in Lucerne, where he died of pneumonia.

Achievements
He was the primary force behind proposals to unify international maritime law. A number of conventions dealing with collision and assistance at sea drawn up in 1910 were soon signed by many nations.

References

External links
 
 Auguste Beernaert in ODIS – Online Database for Intermediary Structures 

|-

1829 births
1912 deaths
Belgian Ministers of State
Belgian Nobel laureates
Catholic Party (Belgium) politicians
Inter-Parliamentary Union
Nobel Peace Prize laureates
Politicians from Ostend
Presidents of the Chamber of Representatives (Belgium)
Prime Ministers of Belgium
Heidelberg University alumni
Members of the Royal Academy of Belgium
Members of the Permanent Court of Arbitration
Catholic University of Leuven (1834–1968) alumni
Finance ministers of Belgium
Belgian judges of international courts and tribunals
Belgian expatriates in Germany